Init sa Magdamag (transl.: Heat at Overnight) is a 1983 Filipino drama film directed by Laurice Guillen. The film stars Lorna Tolentino, Dindo Fernando and Joel Torre.

Cast
 Lorna Tolentino as Irene / Becky Claudio / Leah Sanchez
 Dindo Fernando as Jaime Apacible
 Joel Torre as Armand Javier
 Anita Linda as Sion
 Wendy Villarica as Katrina Jimenez
 Leo Martinez as Mr. Perez
 Bebong Osorio as Man in the Bar
 Ding Salvador as Mr. Eleazar
 Franklin Llamas as Francis
 Remy Novales as Mrs. Eleazar
 Melissa Mendez as Jaime's Date
 Elsa Agana as Party Girl
 Conrado Lamano as Mayor
 Nonoy Zuñiga as Singer

Awards

Theme song
The theme song of the same name was originally performed by Sharon Cuneta and Nonoy Zuñiga. It gained popularity before the movie was released. Other covers include Ariel Rivera, Jun Polistico, Marvin Ong and Maffy Soler which was used as the theme song of the 2011 television series Mga Nagbabagang Bulaklak, and Jona which was used as the theme song of the 2021 television series of the same name.

References

External links

1983 films
Filipino-language films
Philippine drama films
Viva Films films
Films directed by Laurice Guillen